Pleyber-Christ is a commune in the Finistère department of Brittany in north-western France.

Geography

Climate
Pleyber-Christ has a oceanic climate (Köppen climate classification Cfb).

Population
Inhabitants of Pleyber-Christ are called in French Pleybériens.

Breton language
In 2008, 7.05% of primary-school children attended bilingual schools, where Breton language is taught alongside French.[1]

Twinning
Pleyber-Christ was twinned with Lostwithiel in Cornwall, UK in 1979. The people in the Twinning Associations of both towns usually meet up every year, alternating between Lostwithiel and Pleyber-Christ.

See also

Communes of the Finistère department
Roland Doré sculptor
Pleyber-Christ Parish close

References

External links

Mayors of Finistère Association 

Communes of Finistère